Sibila is a village and rural commune in the Cercle of Ségou in the Ségou Region of southern-central Mali. The commune contains 15 villages in an area of approximately 280 square kilometers. In the 2009 census it had a population of 19,185.

References

External links
.
.

Communes of Ségou Region